The 2016 United States Senate election in Idaho was held November 8, 2016, to elect a member of the United States Senate to represent the State of Idaho, concurrently with the 2016 U.S. presidential election, as well as other elections to the United States Senate in other states and elections to the United States House of Representatives and various state and local elections. The primaries were held May 17.

Incumbent Republican Senator Mike Crapo won re-election to a fourth term in office.

Republican primary

Candidates

Declared 
 Mike Crapo, incumbent U.S. Senator

Declined 
 Russ Fulcher, former state senator and candidate for governor in 2014
 Raúl Labrador, U.S. Representative
 Mike Simpson, U.S. Representative

Results

Democratic primary

Candidates

Declared 
 Jerry Sturgill, businessman

Declined 
 Richard H. Stallings, former U.S. Representative, former chairman of the Idaho Democratic Party and nominee for U.S. Senate in 1992
 Larry LaRocco, former U.S. Representative, nominee for lieutenant governor in 2006 and nominee for U.S. Senate in 2008
 Walt Minnick, former U.S. Representative and nominee for U.S. Senate in 1996

Results

Third Party and Independent Candidates

Constitution Party

Declared 
 Pro-Life (formerly known as Marvin Richardson), organic strawberry farmer, anti-abortion activist and perennial candidate
 Ray Writz

Results

Independents

Candidates

Withdrawn 
 Timothy Raty, paralegal and 2004 Libertarian State House candidate

General election

Debates

Polling

Predictions

Results

References

External links 
Official campaign websites
 Mike Crapo (R) for Senate
 Jerry Sturgill (D) for Senate
 Ray Writz (C) for Senate

Senate
Idaho
2016